Hongshan District forms part of the urban core of and is one of 13 urban districts of the prefecture-level city of Wuhan, the capital of Hubei Province, China. The district is named for Mount Hong, located near East Lake. It is the most populous of all the districts, and is the most spacious but least densely populated among the city's seven core districts.

Geography

The district is located primarily on the right bank of the Yangtze River but also includes Tianxing Island and White Sand Island which are in the Yangtze River. The district borders Wuchang and Qingshan to the north and Jiangxia District to the south; it administers the southern bank of the Yangtze, eastern half of East Lake and the northwest of Tangxun Lake; on the left bank it borders, from west to east, Caidian, Hanyang, Jiang'an, Huangpi, and Xinzhou. The district also borders Huarong District, part of the prefecture-level city of Ezhou. There are several mountains in Hongshan District including Mount Hong and Mount Yujia .

Administrative Divisions

The district contains at least 9 subdistricts and 1 township:

Destinations
Happy Valley Wuhan is a theme park in Hongshan District. Opened on 29 April 2012, it is the fifth installation of the Happy Valley theme park chain.

References

County-level divisions of Hubei
Geography of Wuhan